Nicholas Lambrinides (1879–1962) was a Greek-American entrepreneur who built the Skyline Chili chain of chili restaurants based in Cincinnati, Ohio.

Early life
Lambrinides was born a Greek in Kastoria, then part of the Ottoman Empire, now in Greece. He emigrated to the US in 1912 at age 33.

Restaurant owner
In 1949, Lambrinides and his three sons opened a small restaurant in the Cincinnati area now known as Price Hill. They named the restaurant Skyline Chili because of its panoramic view of downtown Cincinnati.

Cincinnati-style chili is a sauce usually used over spaghetti or hot dogs, that contains a blend of spices that with a distinct taste. The recipe for Skyline Chili is a well-kept family secret among Lambrinides' surviving children.

Personal life
Lambrinides and his wife had five sons.

He died in 1962.

References

Emigrants from the Ottoman Empire to the United States
People from Kastoria
Greek Macedonians
American restaurateurs
Businesspeople from Cincinnati
1879 births
1962 deaths
Burials at Spring Grove Cemetery
19th-century Greek Americans